Te Kari Waaka (6 March 1916 – 28 November 1991) was a notable New Zealand Ringatu minister, community leader. Of Māori descent, he identified with the Ngāti Pūkeko and Tuhoe iwi. He was born in Poroporo, Bay of Plenty, New Zealand in 1916.

References

1916 births
1991 deaths
New Zealand Ringatū clergy
Ngāti Awa people
Ngāi Tūhoe people
People from the Bay of Plenty Region